Nakéré Reserve is a partial reserve in Burkina Faso. 
Established in 1957 it is located in Bougouriba Province and covers an area of 365 km.

Protected areas of Burkina Faso
Bougouriba Province
Protected areas established in 1957